Sungam Mosque or Sungam Pallivasal is a mosque in Madurai city, Tamil Nadu, India. The mosque was founded by Muslim Jamath People. It is the oldest mosque in Madurai.It was built by Mughal architecture style.

History 
Nelpettai area is Situated in the Vaigai river bank. This is the center of manufacturing of essential foods for Madurai. Rice and cereals marketed here since the British period. Following the success of Malik Kafur, Madurai Governed under the umbrella of various Muslim rulers. Then Nelpettai became part of the Muslim concentration.

Customs Duty

In Pandiya's period, if anybody enters in Madurai, it was the only way to get over the river Vaigai near Nelpettai. Those coming into the city, Tariffs were collected in the Toll Booth. Muslims built a mosque near Toll Booth. From then on it is called Sungam Mosque.(Sungam means Toll). The mosque is still on display in the old building.

Municipal school
Near the Sungam mosque "Umaru Pulavar high school" is functioning. It is controlled by Madurai Municipal Corporation.

References

Mosques in Tamil Nadu
Mosques in Madurai
Buildings and structures in Madurai
Religious buildings and structures in Madurai
Madurai district